Pecten sulcicostatus, the South African scallop, is a species of large scallops or saltwater clams. They are marine bivalve molluscs in the family Pectinidae, the scallops.

Distribution
This species is found around the South African coast, from the Cape Peninsula to Port Alfred, subtidally to at least 24 m of water.

Description
This animal grows up to 100 mm in length. It has a strongly ribbed shell, with the lower valve curving outwards and the upper valve being flat. The base of the shell has a pair of ear-like protrusions which are equal in size. Individuals of the species have many eyed tentacles which extend outside the shell unless the animal is alarmed. The colour is pale, though it may shade through pink to brown.

Ecology
The South African scallop is usually seen lying on sand or mud surfaces. If disturbed, it can swim by clapping its valves together.

References

External links 

Pectinidae
Bivalves described in 1842